Samantha Rae Haereakau Curtis (born 28 October 1985) is a New Zealand cricketer who currently plays for Northern Districts. She plays primarily as a right-handed batter. She appeared in 20 One Day Internationals and 8 Twenty20 Internationals for New Zealand between 2014 and 2017. She has previously played for Auckland.

References

External links

1985 births
Living people
Cricketers from Auckland
New Zealand women cricketers
New Zealand women One Day International cricketers
New Zealand women Twenty20 International cricketers
Auckland Hearts cricketers
Northern Districts women cricketers